Santosh Kumar Singh is an Indian politician, currently a member of Bharatiya Janata Party and two times Member of Legislative Council from Rohtas.

Recently he inaugurated the Gramin Payjal Yojana in Haudih village of Rohtas district and lauded the Bihar Government for their resolve of village development.

References 

Living people
Members of the Bihar Legislative Council
Year of birth missing (living people)
Bharatiya Janata Party politicians from Bihar